Sentry Rocks is a two high, rugged rocks lying just off Cape Dayman along the north coast of Victoria Land. Mapped by United States Geological Survey (USGS) from surveys and U.S. Navy air photos, 1960–63. The Advisory Committee on Antarctic Names (US-ACAN) applied this descriptive name which is suggestive of the position and appearance of the feature.

Rock formations of Victoria Land
Pennell Coast